London Pride is a 1920 British silent comedy film, directed by Harold M. Shaw, and starring Edna Flugrath, Fred Groves and O. B. Clarence. It was based on a play by Arthur Lyons and Gladys Unger.

Cast
 Edna Flugrath - Cherry
 Fred Groves - Cuthbert Tunks
 O. B. Clarence - Mr. Tunks
 Mary Brough - Mrs. Tunks
 Constance Backner - Maud Murphy
 Frank Stanmore - Mooney
 Douglas Munro - Garlic
 Mary Dibley - Mrs. Topleigh-Trevor
 Cyril Percival - Menzies
 Teddy Arundell - Bill Guppy

References

External links

1920 films
1920 comedy films
British comedy films
British films based on plays
Films directed by Harold M. Shaw
British black-and-white films
British silent feature films
1920s English-language films
1920s British films
Silent comedy films